The Great Lake, officially yingina / Great Lake, is a natural lake and man-made reservoir that is located in the central northern region of Tasmania, Australia.

Location and features
Fed by the Pine Rivulet and Breton Rivulet, the original natural freshwater lake, much smaller in size than its current  surface area, was expanded as a result of the 1922 construction of Miena Dam #2 at its southern outflow into the Shannon River. This dam is considered to be of high heritage value by Engineers Australia.

Miena Dam #2 created the once-famous Shannon Rise, in the 500-metre section of the Shannon River between the dam and Shannon Lagoon. The hatching of thousands of caddis moths in early summer, attracted large numbers of trout and fishermen.

In 1967, a sloping-core rock-fill dam was built just downstream of Miena Dam #2 to increase the maximum-capacity level, destroying the Shannon Rise. It was raised a further  in 1982, causing Miena Dam #2 to be periodically submerged.

After Lake Pedder, the Great Lake is the state's third largest freshwater lake. It is known for its fantastic fly fishing opportunities, particularly after a wet winter or spring when water levels are high, trout can be found ‘tailing’ in the shallow, flooded margins of the lake which provides excellent sight fly fishing.

Water from the lake flows into Poatina Power Station to generate hydro-electric power.

The nearby towns of Liaweenee and Miena are popular holiday shack destinations for local tourists, despite the area's reputation as being one of the coldest places in the generally mild-weathered state. During the winter months, when the weather is hardly conducive to camping, the population of these two small towns drops to two or three hundred.  Parts of the lake surface have frozen during July in some years.

The Lake Highway or Highland Lakes Road runs along the west side of the lake and is sometimes snowed under in winter.

See also

List of lakes in Tasmania
List of reservoirs and dams in Tasmania

References

Further reading
 Jetson, Tim (1989) The roof of Tasmania : a history of the Central Plateau.  Launceston, Tas. : Pelion Press. 
 Tasmania. Hydro-Electric Commission (1925), The hydro-electric power of Tasmania : a description of the Great Lake Hydro-Electric Development and of the Tasmanian Electricity Supply System Published under authority, Hydro-Electric Department of Tasmania, Tait, Melbourne

Lakes of Tasmania
Central Highlands (Tasmania)
Reservoirs in Tasmania